The 2004 Copa América Final was the final of the 41st Copa América. The match was played in Lima, for the first time. This was the fifth final for Brazil (winning two of the previous). Meanwhile, was the second for Argentina (winning once).

Carlos Amarilla was the referee for the final match. He refereed two more matches in previous stages of the tournament, both involving Argentina: first against Ecuador in the first round and against Peru in the quarter-finals.

Route to the final

Match details

|}

References

Final, 2004 Copa America
Copa América finals
Brazil national football team matches
Argentina national football team matches
Copa America Final 2004
Argentina–Brazil football rivalry at Copa América
Brazil at the 2004 Copa América
Argentina at the 2004 Copa América
Sports competitions in Lima
2000s in Lima
July 2004 sports events in South America